Tupitsyno is a rural locality (a village) in Sheybukhtovskoye Rural Settlement, Mezhdurechensky District, Vologda Oblast, Russia. The population was 9 as of 2002.

Geography 
Tupitsyno is located 22 km southwest of Shuyskoye (the district's administrative centre) by road. Tupitsyno is the nearest rural locality.

References 

Rural localities in Mezhdurechensky District, Vologda Oblast